The fifth election to the Carmarthenshire County Council was held in March 1901. It was preceded by the 1898 election and followed by the 1904 election.

Overview of the result

The Liberals retained a strong majority. With a few exceptions, members were returned unopposed.

Candidates

Only six seats were contested. Eleven of those elected at the first election, and who had served continuosly since then, sought re-election.

None of the retiring aldermen sought election as candidates. There was also a vacancy following the death of W.O. Brigstocke, Blaenpant.

Outcome

An uneventful election saw virtually no change in the political composition of the council.

At the annual meering, the six retiring aldermen were supported by the majority of members but there was no unanimity on replacement for Henry Wilkins, who stood down, and W.O. Brigstocke, who had died in office. W.N. Jones polled 26 votes, only three fewer than the eighth candidate, Augustus Brigstocke.

Ward Results

Abergwili

Bettws

Caio

Carmarthen Eastern Ward (Lower Division)

Carmarthen Eastern Ward (Upper Division)

Carmarthen Western Ward (Lower Division)

Carmarthen Western Ward (Upper Division)

Cenarth

Cilycwm

Conwil

Kidwelly

Laugharne

Llanarthney

Llanboidy

Llandebie

Llandilo Rural

Llandilo Urban

Llandovery

Llanedy

Llanegwad

Llanelly Division.1

Llanelly Division 2

Llanelly Division 3

Llanelly Division 4

Llanelly Division 5

Llanelly Division 6

Llanelly Division 7

Llanelly Division 8

Llanelly Rural, Berwick

Llanelly Rural, Hengoed

Llanelly Rural, Westfa and Glyn

Llanfihangel Aberbythick

Llanfihangel-ar-Arth

Llangadock

Llangeler

Llangendeirne

Llangennech

Llangunnor

Llanon

Llansawel

Llanstephan

Llanybyther
Both candidates received the same number of votes so the contest was decided upon the toss of a coin.

Mothvey

Pembrey North

Pembrey South
It was a reflection of the largely non-political character of the 1901 county election in Carmarthenshire (with the vast majority being elected unopposed) that the political affiliation of the two candidates for this ward was not recorded in the local press.

Quarter Bach

Rhydcymmerai

St Clears

St Ishmael

Trelech

Whitland

Election of Aldermen

In addition to the 51 councillors the council consisted of 17 county aldermen. Aldermen were elected by the council, and served a six-year term. Following the elections the following eight aldermen were elected (with the number of votes recorded in each case).

The following retiring aldermen were re-elected:

John Bevan, retiring alderman (48)
Joseph Joseph, retiring alderman (45)
Sir Lewis Morris, retiring alderman (44)
Daniel Stephens, retiring alderman (45)
H J Thomas, retiring alderman (48)
Thomas Watkins, retiring alderman (44)

In addition, two new aldermen were elected:

Joseph Mayberry, elected member for Llanelli Ward 2 (34)
Augustus Brigstocke, from outside the Council (29)

One retiring aldermen was not re-elected
Henry Wilkins, Llanelli

References

1901
1901 Welsh local elections